Oława (pronounced  ,) is a historic town in south-western Poland with 33,029 inhabitants (2019). It is situated in Lower Silesian Voivodeship (from 1975–1998 it was in the former Wrocław Voivodeship), within the Wrocław metropolitan area. It is the seat of Oława County and of the smaller administrative district of Gmina Oława (although it is not part of the territory of the latter, as the town is an urban gmina in its own right).

History
Oława began to develop during the 11th or early 12th century at a site that was protected by the rivers Oder and Oława, when it was part of the Piast-ruled Kingdom of Poland. It was first mentioned as Oloua in a document of 1149 confirming Piotr Włostowic's donation to the abbey of St. Vincent in Wrocław. In 1206 Oława became one of the residential towns of the dukes of the Silesian Piast dynasty, who also granted Oława the status of a town in 1234. As a result of the fragmentation of Poland, Oława at various times formed part of the duchies of Silesia, Legnica and Brzeg.

During its history Oława was destroyed completely three times. In 1241 it was destroyed during the First Mongol invasion of Poland, in 1448 by the Hussites, and again in 1634 during the Thirty Years' War. After the Polish King Casimir III had renounced his rights on Silesia with the contract of Trenčín in 1335, Silesia became until 1806 a part of the Holy Roman Empire as a Bohemian fief, although the town remained under the rule of the Polish Piast dynasty as part of the Duchy of Legnica until 1675. In 1526, when the Habsburgs gained the Bohemian crown, Silesia came under Austrian suzerainty. In 1527 with the Reformation High German language came in use and with it the first usage of the version of the town's name Ohlau is reported. Following the death of the last Silesian Piast duke George IV William of Legnica in 1675, Oława ceased to be a residence town. In spite of Habsburg political influence, in the 17th century, the town was still part of the territory dominated by the Polish language. Oława found itself again under Polish rule, when Polish prince James Louis Sobieski, son of King John III Sobieski, became duke of Oława in years 1691–1737. Together with most of Silesia, the town became part of the Kingdom of Prussia in 1742.

The 18th and 19th centuries were a period of economic growth and Oława (then as Ohlau) became well known as a centre of tobacco-growing. Ethnic Polish traditions and population also remained strong in the area, with a large influx of people from nearby Congress Poland. In 1842 a railroad between Ohlau and Wrocław, the first in Silesia, was opened. Poles smuggled large amounts of gunpowder through the town to the Russian Partition of Poland during the January Uprising in 1863.

The historic town of Ohlau did not suffer any damage during World War I, however, in World War II about 60% of the buildings were destroyed. On 2 September 1939, a Polish PZL.23 Karaś bomber (scout) plane bombed a German factory in the city in the first attack on German territory after the German invasion of Poland and the outbreak of World War II the day before. During the war, the Germans established and operated two labour subcamps of the Stalag VIII-B/344 prisoner-of-war camp in the town. After Nazi Germany's defeat in the war, the town became again part of Poland. Oława also became a garrison town of the Soviet Red Army Northern Group of Forces and remained so until 1992.

Flag and Coat of Arms

The flag of Oława presents the Coat of Arms of Oława, on a diagonally divided white-red background.

The Coat of Arms presents a white rooster on a red-shield background, looking to the left. There are two traditional hypotheses for the origin of the Coat of Arms:

The symbol links in with Walloonian weavers; historically located in Oława's land - and the Coat of Arms of Wallonia - a red rooster on a yellow background.
The shield originates from the town Coat of Arms of the Czech knight family of Olav.

Neither hypothesis explains the look of the Coat of Arms in relation to Oława. 
The Coat of Arms of Oława is identical on the basis and content of the Kur coat of arms.

On the basis that the Coat of Arms of Oława is in relation to the Kur coat of arms, such hypothesis can be deemed highly agreeable. The Kur coat of arms can be linked to Jan of Kur, a knight of Konrad I of Głogów, being the owner of the village of Kurów Wielki in 1266, in the Polkowice County. The coat of arms can also be also traced back to the personage of Szyban von Der - the court adjudicator of Henry III of Głogów - erroneously equated to Szaban Tader, a castellan of the Świny Castle, mentioned in Franciszek Piekosiński's book - Heraldyka polska wieków średnich - (Heraldry of Polish Middle Ages) published in Kraków, in 1899; where the document is sealed with the town's Coat of Arms from 1300.

Economy
 

Oława is the centre for industry and production in the Oława County. The town's industries include the production of electronics (namely Electrolux Poland and Nardi Appliances), furniture and car parts.

Largest industries include:
 Zm Silesia SA (formerly Huta Oława S.A.) – production of zinc oxide, lead oxide and cadmium oxide
 SCA Hygiene Products – production of nappies for toddlers and adults
 DS Smith – packaging production
 Autoliv Poland – production of seat belts and car airbags
 Centrozłom Wrocław PPZM – branch of metal recycling
 The Lorenz Bahlsen Snack-World Sp. z o.o. – food production
 Ergis SA – packaging production
 MetalErg – furniture processing and packaging
 Tabex – car parts production
 ZNTK Oława Sp. z o.o. – train repair department
 Zakpol – architrave production
 Marco – plastic materials production
 Formtech – plastic materials production
 Rotex – plastic materials production
 Atex Sp. z o.o. – muffler and petrol tank production
 Electrolux Poland – electronics
 Nardi Appliances Poland – electronics
 Standis Polska Sp. z o.o. - shop furniture production
 Bama Europa Sp. z o.o. - confectionery production

Sports
It competes in the lower leagues.

Notable people

John Christian of Brzeg-Legnica (1591–1639), Duke of Brzeg and Legnica, member of the Piast dynasty
George Rudolf of Legnica (1595–1653), Duke of Legnica, member of the Piast dynasty
Christian of Brzeg-Legnica (1618–1672), Duke of Brzeg and Legnica, member of the Piast dynasty, candidate for the Polish throne
George IV William of Legnica (1660–1675), Duke of Legnica, last ruling member of the Piast dynasty
Maria Karolina Sobieska (1697–1740), Polish noblewoman, duchesse de Bouillon, daughter of James Louis Sobieski
Maria Clementina Sobieska (1702–1735), Polish noblewoman, wife of the Jacobite pretender James Francis Edward Stuart, sister of the above
 Johann Baptist Alzog (1808–1878), German theologian and Catholic church historian.
 Alfred Pringsheim (1850–1941), German mathematician and patron of the arts
 Hermann Eberhard (1852–1908), German explorer
 Bernhard Lichtenberg (1875–1943), German Roman Catholic priest and theologian, awarded the title righteous among the Nations.
 Leopold Lichtwitz (1876–1943), German-American internist
 Hans-Georg von der Marwitz (1893–1925), German World War I flying ace
 Bernd Eistert, (1902–1978) German chemist
 Peter Yorck von Wartenburg, (1904–1944) German jurist and a member of the German Resistance against Nazism
 Hans Kloss (1938–2018), German artist and graphic designer
 Marek Wrona (born 1966), Polish racing cyclist, Tour de Pologne winner
 Adam Wójcik (1970–2017), Polish basketball player, 8-time Polish champion
Paweł Mykietyn (born 1971), Polish composer
Szymon Kołecki (born 1981), Polish weightlifter who won the gold medal at the 2008 Olympic Games in Beijing after doping reanalysis
Marek Gancarczyk (born 1983), Polish footballer
Janusz Gancarczyk (born 1984), Polish footballer
Maciej Bodnar (born 1985), Polish professional cyclist
Mateusz Rudyk (born 1995), Polish track cyclist

Twin towns – sister cities

Oława is twinned with:

 Česká Třebová, Czech Republic
 Oberasbach, Germany
 Priolo Gargallo, Italy
 Sighetu Marmației, Romania
 Zolochiv, Ukraine

See also
 PZL.23 Karas

References

External links

  Municipal website
 Jewish Community in Oława on Virtual Shtetl
 

Cities and towns in Lower Silesian Voivodeship
Oława County
Cities in Silesia